Praia Verde 2M Airport  is a coastal airstrip in Castro Marim Municipality, Portugal, near the border with Spain.

The airstrip appears abandoned.  Google Earth 2006 historical imagery shows a maintained, unpaved runway in use.  2014 imagery shows the runway and ramp area overgrown with weeds and shrubs.

See also
Transport in Portugal
List of airports in Portugal

References

 OurAirports - Praia Verde
 Great Circle Mapper - Praia Verde
 Google Earth

External links

Airports in Portugal